The 2007–08 New Orleans Hornets season was the Hornets' 6th season in the National Basketball Association. They returned to New Orleans full-time for the first time since 2004–05. The Hornets had the sixth best team offensive rating in the NBA.

Although they declined an option to play part of this season at the Ford Center in Oklahoma City, Oklahoma, as they did for most of the previous two seasons, they did play their first preseason game at the Ford Center on October 9 for a final curtain call.

On February 21, 2008 Bobby Jackson was traded to the Houston Rockets along with teammate Adam Haluska for Bonzi Wells and Mike James  as part of a three team deal involving Houston and the Memphis Grizzlies. Also, Marcus Vinicius was traded to the Rockets where they traded him to the Memphis Grizzlies to gain the rights to Malick Badiane and Sergei Lishouk.

The Hornets finished the regular season with a record of 56–26, good enough for winning the Southwest Division. This title was clinched with their win over the Los Angeles Clippers on April 15, and marks the first division title for the franchise. Their record also ensured the 2nd seed for the Western Conference playoffs. The Hornets closed the season with a 30–11 record at home along with a 26–15 road record. It is the only season in New Orleans franchise history that they have won 50 games in a season. The Hornets' accomplishments in the season earned coach Byron Scott the
NBA Coach of the Year award.

On April 29 won game 5 of their first round playoff series vs. the 7th seeded Dallas Mavericks, thereby winning the series 4–1. This mark the first time in franchise history that they have won a seven-game playoff series. In his post-season debut, Chris Paul became the first player in NBA history to have at least 30 points and 10 assists in his first two playoff games. On May 19 the Hornets season ended after they were eliminated in game 7 by the defending champions San Antonio Spurs.

This was the first and only time a non Texas based franchise would win the Southwest Division, until 14 years later when the Memphis Grizzlies won its first division title in franchise history. 

The team would not win another playoffs series until the 2017-18 season where they upset the 3rd seeded Portland Trail Blazers with an astonishing sweep.

NBA All-Star Game
Byron Scott was named the Western Conference Team head coach for the NBA All-Star Game on February 17, 2008. It came after the Dallas Mavericks lost to the Boston Celtics on January 31. He was the first hornets head coach to ever coach in an NBA All-Star Game in the whole franchise history. Chris Paul and David West were also named reserves for the game. This would be the first All-Star appearance for the both of them.  In addition, Peja Stojaković participated in the Three Point Shootout.

Key dates prior to the start of the season:

The 2007 NBA draft took place in New York City on June 28.
The free agency period begins in July.

Offseason

Draft picks
New Orleans' selections from the 2007 NBA draft in New York City.

Roster

Regular season

Season standings

Record vs. opponents

Game log

October
Record: 1–0; Home: 1–0; Road: 0–0

November
Record: 10–6; Home: 2–4; Road: 8–2

December
Record: 10–4; Home: 6–2; Road: 4–3

January
Record: 12-2; Home: 7-2; Road: 5–0

February
Record: 7–5; Home: 4–2; Road: 3–3

March
Record: 11–4 ; Home: 7–0 ; Road: 4–4

April
Record: 6-4 ; Home: 3-1 ; Road: 3-3

Green background indicates win.
Red background indicates loss.

Playoffs

|- bgcolor="bbffbb"
| 1 || April 19 || Dallas || 104–92 || Paul (35) || Chandler (15) || Paul (10) ||New Orleans Arena17,446 || 1–0
|- bgcolor="bbffbb"
| 2 || April 22 || Dallas || 127–103 || Paul (32) || Chandler (11) || Paul (17) ||New Orleans Arena17,855 || 2–0
|- bgcolor="edbebf"
| 3 || April 25 || @ Dallas || 87–97 || Pargo (30) || Chandler (11) || Paul (10) ||American Airlines Center20,839 || 2–1
|- bgcolor="bbffbb"
| 4 || April 27 || @ Dallas || 97–84 || West (24) || West (9) || Paul (8) ||American Airlines Center20,644 || 3–1
|- bgcolor="bbffbb"
| 5 || April 29 || Dallas || 99–94 || West (25) || Chandler (14) || Paul (15) ||New Orleans Arena18,260 || 4–1
|-

|- bgcolor="bbffbb"
| 1 || May 3 || San Antonio || 101–82 || West (30) || Chandler (15) || Paul (13) || New Orleans Arena18,040 || 1–0
|- bgcolor="bbffbb"
| 2 || May 5 || San Antonio || 102–84 || Paul (30) || Chandler (11) || Paul (12) || New Orleans Arena17,927 || 2–0
|- bgcolor="edbebf"
| 3 || May 8 || @ San Antonio || 99–110 || Paul (35) || West (12) || Paul (9) || AT&T Center18,797 || 2–1
|- bgcolor="edbebf"
| 4 || May 11 || @ San Antonio || 80–100 || Paul (23) || Armstrong, Paul (6) || Paul (5) || AT&T Center18,797 || 2–2
|- bgcolor="bbffbb"
| 5 || May 13 || San Antonio || 101–79  || West (38) || West (14) || Paul (14) || New Orleans Arena18,246 || 3–2
|- bgcolor="edbebf"
| 6 || May 15 || @ San Antonio || 80–99 || Paul (21) || Five-way tie (6) || Paul (8) || AT&T Center18,797 || 3–3 
|- bgcolor="edbebf"
| 7 || May 19 || San Antonio || 82–91 || West (20) || Chandler (15) || Paul (14) || New Orleans Arena18,235 || 3–4
|-

Player stats

Regular season 

*Total for entire season including previous team(s)

Playoffs

Awards and records

Awards
Byron Scott, NBA Coach of the Year Award
Chris Paul, All-NBA First Team
Chris Paul, NBA All-Defensive Second Team

Records

Season
 The Hornets set franchise records in wins (56) and road wins (26). 
 Chris Paul set franchise records in:
 double-doubles (56)
 total assists (925)
 total steals (217)
 10 or more assists (59)

Playoffs
 In Game 2 vs. the Mavericks, the Hornets set franchise marks in: 
 Most points in a quarter: 39 in 1st
 Most points in a half: 67 in 1st
 Most points in a game: 127
 Most 3-pt FG made (team): 10
 Most assists in game: Chris Paul, 17
 total points: 127
 Chris Paul set a franchise record 17 assists in Game 2 against the Dallas Mavericks.

Milestones
 The Hornets won their first-ever division title in franchise history (including the tenure in Charlotte.).
 Byron Scott became the Hornets first Coach of the Year recipient.

Playoffs
 The Hornets won their first playoff series since moving to New Orleans in 2002. 
 Chris Paul averaged 24 points, 12 assists and 2 steals in the five-game first round series vs the Mavericks, becoming the sixth player and first in 17 years to do so.
• Paul first player in history with back-to-back 30-pt, 10-ast, 3-steal games. Also first player in history with 30 points and 10 assists in first two career playoff games.

Transactions
The Hornets have been involved in the following transactions during the 2007–08 season.

Trades

Free agents

See also
2007–08 NBA season

References

New Orleans Hornets seasons
2007–08 NBA season by team